Longlow Rock is a rock  south-southwest of Borley Point and  off the west shore of Montagu Island, in the South Sandwich Islands. It was charted and named in 1930 by Discovery Investigations personnel on the Discovery II.

References

External links

Rock formations of South Georgia and the South Sandwich Islands